"The Motto" is a song by Canadian rapper Drake featuring American rapper Lil Wayne. It is a digital iTunes Store bonus track from Drake's second studio album Take Care. "The Motto" premiered on Power 106 on October 31, 2011. Drake released the song on his OVO blog a day later. It was first played on rhythmic top 40 radio stations on November 29, 2011 as the album's fourth single. Drake says in the song Spanish girls (Latinas) love him like the band Aventura.

The track has sold over three million copies in the United States. It peaked atop both the US Hot R&B/Hip-Hop Songs and US Rap Songs charts, and was ranked 20 on the Billboard Hot 100 Year-end Chart. "The Motto" was nominated for Best Rap Song at the 55th Grammy Awards. Peaking at number 14, the song is one of the few songs to rank within the top 20 in the year-end chart without reaching  the top ten. A music video directed by Lamar Taylor and Hyghly Alleyne  was released on YouTube on February 10, 2012 and features cameos from E-40 and Mistah F.A.B.

It is best known for popularizing the acronym YOLO (You Only Live Once).

Music video
The music video for the remix with Tyga was filmed in San Francisco, California. It was dedicated to West Coast hip hop Bay Area artist Mac Dre.

Remixes and freestyles
 Drake, featuring Lil Wayne & Tyga (Official remix)
 YG, Nipsey Hussle and Snoop Dogg
 Nelly (Released through the Mixtape O.E.MO)
 Jeremih
 Mario
 Tinie Tempah Christmas Freestyle
 Young Jeezy and Freddie Gibbs
 Wale and Meek Mill
 Wiz Khalifa, Juicy J, Berner
 Nekfeu, Alpha Wann, Sneazzy West (1995) (France)

Cultural impact
The song uses the phrase YOLO, an acronym for "you only live once". The phrase can be seen in youth culture: for example, a high school prank in Chicago, Illinois, involved high school students chanting "YOLO." Some people have graffitied YOLO on walls. It had become a popular Twitter hashtag by the end of the following year. Some youth at the time had said that it was their motto for some time.

The hip-hop magazine Da South reported that the rapper Lecrae has deconstructed the motto YOLO in his answer song "No Regrets". The Washington Post describes YOLO as "the newest acronym you'll love to hate". The Huffington Post says: "YOLO is dumb."

The phrase "you only live once" is commonly attributed to Mae West, but variations of the phrase have been in use for over 100 years, including as far back as (the German equivalent of) "one lives but once in the world" by Johann Wolfgang von Goethe in the play Clavigo in 1774, and as the title of a waltz Man lebt nur einmal! ("You Only Live Once!") by Johann Strauss II in 1855.

Accolades
The song received a nomination at the 2013 Grammy Awards.

Chart performance
The song debuted at number 18 on the US Billboard Hot 100 chart with first-week sales of 124,000. In its 22nd week, it ascended to number 14. On the week of February 18, 2012, "The Motto" reached number one on the US Rap Chart making it his 12th number one on the chart and extending his lead as the artist with the most number one hits since the chart began. As of April 2013, the song has sold 3,113,000 copies in the United States.

Charts

Weekly charts

Year-end charts

Certifications

Release history

See also
 List of number-one R&B/hip-hop songs of 2012 (U.S.)
 List of Billboard Hot Rap Songs number-one hits of the 2010s#2012

References

2011 songs
2011 singles
Drake (musician) songs
Lil Wayne songs
Tyga songs
Cash Money Records singles
Songs written by Drake (musician)
Songs written by Lil Wayne
Song recordings produced by T-Minus (record producer)
Songs written by T-Minus (record producer)
Songs written by Tyga